Shwetha Bandekar is an Indian film and Tamil television actress who has appeared in Tamil and Telugu films and Tamil serials. She has appeared in films including Aalwar, Valluvan Vasuki, as well as in the Sun TV series Chandralekha.

Personal life
Bandekar completed a Bachelor of Technology degree at the PMR Engineering College near Chennai and a Master of Business Administration degree.

Career
Bandekar first acted in the Tamil film Aalwar as Ajith Kumar's sister. From 2007 to 2012, She was female lead in over five films. She began acting in the teleserial Magal as Swapna which ran for more than 1000 episodes in Sun TV.

Filmography

Films

Television 
Serials

Shows

Advertisements
Cinthol Soap - Tamil
Udaya Krishna Pure Ghee - Tamil

References 

Indian television actresses
Indian film actresses
Actresses in Tamil cinema
Living people
Actresses in Telugu cinema
Tamil television actresses
21st-century Indian actresses
Actresses in Tamil television
Actresses from Chennai
Year of birth missing (living people)